Tenacibaculum ascidiaceicola is a Gram-negative and non-spore-forming bacterium from the genus of Tenacibaculum which has been isolated from the sea squirt Halocynthia aurantium.

References

External links
Type strain of Tenacibaculum ascidiaceicola at BacDive -  the Bacterial Diversity Metadatabase

Flavobacteria
Bacteria described in 2016